Anders Østli (born 8 January 1983 in Fredrikstad) is a Norwegian footballer currently under contract for Norwegian side Kråkerøy, where he is a playing assistant coach.

Career statistics

References

External links
 Anders Østli at Soccerway
 Anders Østli at Fotball.no

1983 births
Living people
Norwegian footballers
Association football defenders
Fredrikstad FK players
Moss FK players
SønderjyskE Fodbold players
BK Skjold players
Lillestrøm SK players
Sarpsborg 08 FF players
Eliteserien players
Norwegian First Division players
Danish Superliga players
Norwegian expatriate footballers
Expatriate men's footballers in Denmark
Norwegian expatriate sportspeople in Denmark
Sportspeople from Fredrikstad